Empire is the fifth studio album by American Christian hip hop artist Derek Minor, released on January 27, 2015. It was released through RMG and Entertainment One.

Concept
Derek Minor explained that the concept of the album addresses how people build their own empires vs. the empire of God.

Critical reception

Kevin Hoskins from Jesus Freak Hideout gave the album a 4.5 out of 5, saying "the beats are amazing, the rapping flows wonderfully, and there's an abundance of great guest spots. All rap fans need to grab this album as it has the potential to be the best hip hop album in what is gearing up to be a great year for hip hop music." Ronald Grant of HipHopDX rated the album a 3.5 out of 5, describing it as a "bold body of with Derek Minor applying message to a form that can appear nihilistic." Mark Ryan awarded the album 4.5 out of 5, claiming it is a "truly provoking and, as has become expected, the quality is top notch." Anthony Peronto from Indie Vision Music assigned the album a 4 out of 5, declaring it as "a powerful statement on kingdom-building and has raised the bar for what could be a fantastic year for music." Grace S. Aspinwall from CCM Magazine gave the album 3 out of 5, writing "Overall, Empire is a promising preview-with his superior songwriting and performance, we expect to hear much more from Derek Minor in the years to come." Thom Jurek from AllMusic gave the album a 3.5 out of 5 also saying "Empire is massive: it's creative, expansive, and expertly sequenced. No matter what your spiritual predilection, there is much to enjoy here. Minor is not only a great rapper, but an excellent conceptual thinker. This is CCHH at its best." Steve Hayes from Cross Rhythms gave the album a 9 out of ten describing, "'Empire' is a search for meaning and grace amid the false gods and temptations of a fallen world."

Commercial performance
The album debuted at number 54 on the Billboard 200 with first week sales of approximately 11,000 copies.

Track listing

References

Derek Minor albums
2015 albums
Albums produced by Gawvi
Albums produced by Beam